Charles Henry Gordon-Lennox, 8th Duke of Richmond, 8th Duke of Lennox, 3rd Duke of Gordon  (30 December 1870 – 7 May 1935), known as Lord Settrington 1870–1903, and as Earl of March 1903–1928, was a British peer and politician.

Biography
Lord Settrington was the son of Charles Gordon-Lennox, 7th Duke of Richmond (at the time known as Earl of March, as his father, the 6th Duke was still alive) by his first wife, Amy Mary Ricardo (1849–1879), daughter of Percy Ricardo, of Bramley Park and Mathilde Hensley. He was styled as Earl of March when his father held the dukedom, and inherited the dukedom upon his father's death in 1928, holding the title for only seven years.

He was promoted to captain while in the service of the 3rd (Militia) Battalion, Royal Sussex Regiment. In December 1899 he was seconded as a staff officer, and appointed an Aide-de-camp to Lord Roberts, Commander-in-Chief of the forces in South Africa during the early part of the Second Boer War. He was appointed Lieutenant-Colonel in command of the Sussex Yeomanry on 8 July 1914, just before the outbreak of World War I.

Family

Lord Settrington married Hilda Madeline Brassey (1872 – 29 December 1971) on 8 June 1893; they had five children:  
     
 Lady Amy Gwendolin Gordon-Lennox (5 May 1894 – 27 April 1975); married Sir James Stuart Coats, 3rd Bt.
 The Hon. Charles Henry Gordon-Lennox (15 August 1895 – 5 September 1895)
 Lady Doris Hilda Gordon-Lennox (6 September 1896 – 5 February 1980); married Commander Clare George Vyner. She was a close friend of Queen Elizabeth The Queen Mother.
  (26 January 1899 – 24 August 1919 of war wounds)
 Frederick Charles Gordon-Lennox, 9th Duke of Richmond, 9th Duke of Lennox, 4th Duke of Gordon (5 February 1904 – 2 November 1989)

Ancestry

References

External links
 

Charles Gordon-Lennox, 8th Duke of Richmond

1870 births
1935 deaths
Companions of the Distinguished Service Order
Deputy Lieutenants of Banffshire
208
308
203
Charles
Irish Guards officers
Richmond
Members of the Royal Victorian Order
Lord-Lieutenants of Moray
Deputy Lieutenants of Moray
Deputy Lieutenants of Sussex
British Army personnel of the Second Boer War
Royal Sussex Regiment officers
British Army personnel of World War I
Dukes of Aubigny